Eleni Patsiou (born 5 September 1971) is a Greek judoka.

She competed in the heavyweight class at the 2004 Summer Olympics, but was knocked out in the first round by French Eva Bisseni.

References
Sports Reference

1971 births
Living people
Greek female judoka
Judoka at the 2004 Summer Olympics
Olympic judoka of Greece
21st-century Greek women